John "Jay" Ashley Bolt (born December 6, 1994) is an American soccer player.

Career
Bolt played fours years of college soccer at North Florida University between 2013 and 2016. Bolt spent time with National Premier Soccer League side Jacksonville Armada U-23 in 2016.

Bolt signed with United Soccer League club Charleston Battery on January 25, 2018.

References

1994 births
Living people
American soccer players
Association football defenders
Charleston Battery players
Jacksonville Armada U-23 players
North Florida Ospreys men's soccer players
Soccer players from Jacksonville, Florida
USL Championship players